John Somerville may refer to:
John Somerville (sculptor) (born 1951)
John Somerville (Australian footballer) (1939–1984), Australian rules footballer
John Somerville (conspirator) (1560–1583), plotted against Elizabeth I of England
John Somerville, 3rd Lord Somerville (died 1491)
John Somerville, 4th Lord Somerville (died 1523)
John Somerville (Scottish footballer), Scottish footballer and manager
John Somerville (bowls) (1926–1987), New Zealand lawn bowls player
John Somerville (philosopher) (born 1905), recipient of the Gandhi Peace Award
John Somerville (minister) (1774-1839) inventor of the safety catch